Edward S. and Mary Annatoile Albert Lilly House is a historic home located at Cape Girardeau, Missouri.  It was built in 1897, and is a -story, Colonial Revival style brick dwelling.  It has a full-width wraparound front porch with classical columns and porte cochere. It features a medium pitched hipped roof with pediment dormers, ornate pressed metal cornice with dentils and pressed metal window hoods.  Also on the property is a contributing -story brick carriage house.

It was listed on the National Register of Historic Places in 2008.

References

Houses on the National Register of Historic Places in Missouri
Colonial Revival architecture in Missouri
Houses completed in 1897
Houses in Cape Girardeau County, Missouri
National Register of Historic Places in Cape Girardeau County, Missouri